Ludovic Pancrate (born 23 February 1987) is a French professional football player.

He played on the professional level in Ligue 2 for US Créteil-Lusitanos in the 2006–07 Ligue 2 season, making his debut for the club in the game against FC Gueugnon on 26 January 2007.

After three seasons with Créteil he joined UJA Alfortville for two seasons, and then spent five seasons with L'Entente SSG. He spent the first half of 2016 with Dinan-Léhon, signing for Ivry in August of the same year.

In 2019 he spent time with AS Excelsior in Réunion.

He signed for a second time with Créteil for the 2019–20 season, leaving for Versailles at the end of the season, but returning to Créteil for a third time after just three months.

References

External links

1987 births
Living people
French footballers
Ligue 2 players
Championnat National players
Championnat National 2 players
Le Mans FC players
US Créteil-Lusitanos players
UJA Maccabi Paris Métropole players
Entente SSG players
US Ivry players
AS Excelsior players
FC Versailles 78 players
Martiniquais footballers
Martinique international footballers
Association football forwards